William Binham was an English theologian and Benedictine prior of Wallingford in Berkshire. He took the degree of D.D. at Oxford, where he was for a time intimate with Wycliffe, against whom he afterwards wrote Contra Positiones Wiclevi.

Life 
William Binham was a native of Binham in Norfolk, where there was a Benedictine priory dependent on the abbey of St. Albans. Probably through this connection he entered the monastic profession at the abbey, and became ultimately prior of Wallingford in Berkshire, which was also a cell belonging to St. Albans. The last notice of Binham's life occurs in 1396, when he, as prior of Wallingford, was detained by illness from attending the election of an abbot of St. Albans on 9 October.

Works 
John Bale states that Binham wrote a book (his only recorded work) against the teachings of Wycliffe, Contra Positiones Wiclevi, or Contra Vuiclevi propositiones. It is not known to be extant, but Wyclife's reply, Contra Willelmum Vynham monachum S. Albani Determinatio, or Contra Bynhamum monachum, is preserved in a Paris manuscript. If Binham was the opponent mentioned by Wyclife, he must have been a student at Oxford, of which university he is described as doctor of divinity, and had there come into close intimacy with Wycliffe. Binham, however, remained true to the traditions of the Church and the rights of the clergy, and after a while separated himself from his friend, with whom at length he engaged in controversy, and proved, according to the Catholic Leland, no match for his antagonist.

Notes

References

Sources 

 
 Leland, John (1709). Commentarii de Scriptoribus Britannicis. Vol. 2. Oxford: Theatro Sheldoniano. Cap. cdxxviii. p. 381.
 Riley, Henry Thomas, ed. (1869). Gesta Abbatum Monasterii Sancti Albani, a Thoma Walsingham. Vol. 3. London: Longmans, Green, and Co. p. 426.
 Shirley, Walter Waddington (1865). A Catalogue of the Original Works of Wyclif. Oxford: Clarendon Press. p. 20.

Attribution:

Further reading 

 Bale, John (1557–1559). Scriptorum illustrium majoris Britanniæ … Catalogus. Vol. 2. Basel: I. Oporinum. Cap. v. p. 458.
 Buddensieg, Rudolf, ed. (1883). John Wiclif's Polemical works in Latin. Vol. 1. London: Trübner & Co. p. lxiv.
 Loserth, Johann, ed. (1913; repr. 1966). Johannis Wyclif: Opera Minora. London: C. K. Paul & Co. pp. 415–435.
 Tanner, Thomas (1748). Bibliotheca Britannico-Hibernica. London: Gulielmus Bowyer. p. 101.
 Turner, William H.; Coxe, H. O., eds. (1878). Calendar of Charters and Rolls preserved in the Bodleian Library. Oxford: Clarendon Press. p. 4.

14th-century births
14th-century English Roman Catholic theologians
14th-century English clergy
14th-century English writers
English Benedictines